Jacques Frisch (born 18 December 1987) is a Luxembourgian athlete specialising in the 400 metres hurdles. He represented his country at the 2013 World Championships without finishing his heat.

His personal best in the event is 50.94 seconds set in Chambéry in 2013. This is the current national record.

International competitions

References

1987 births
Living people
Luxembourgian male hurdlers
World Athletics Championships athletes for Luxembourg
Athletes (track and field) at the 2015 European Games
European Games competitors for Luxembourg